Zeebo Sports is a Brazil-only series of video games for the Zeebo system.

The series was originally named Boomerang Sports, because the games were designed exclusively for use with Zeebo's "Boomerang" motion-sensitive controller. In August 2010, however, Zeebo released new versions of the games that can use either the Boomerang or the standard Zeebo gamepad. The series was renamed Zeebo Sports.

The games

Released

References

External links
 Zeebo Brazil Games Page

Zeebo games
Video game franchises
Video games developed in Brazil